Pierre de Bocosel de Chastelard (1540–1563), French poet, was born in Dauphiné; a scion of the house of Bayard, grandson of Chevalier de Bayard. His name is inseparably connected with Mary, Queen of Scots, for whom he conceived an insane passion.

Career

From the service of the Constable Montmorency, Chastelard, then a page, passed to the household of Marshal Damville, whom he accompanied in his journey to Scotland in escort of Mary (1561). He returned to Paris in the marshal's train, but left for Scotland again shortly afterwards, bearing letters of recommendation to Mary from his old protector, Montmorency, and the Regrets addressed to the Queen Dowager of France by Pierre de Ronsard, his master in the art of song. He undertook to transmit to the poet the service of plate with which Mary rewarded him. But he had fallen in love with the queen, who is said to have encouraged his passion.

Copies of verse passed between them; she lost no occasion of showing herself partial to his person and conversation. The young man was welcomed in her cabinet room. One day he hid himself under her bed at Holyrood Palace, where he was discovered by her maids of honour, or two male grooms of the chamber. Mary pardoned the offence, and the old familiar terms between them were resumed. Chastelard was so rash as again to violate her privacy. He was discovered a second time under her bed at Burntisland, seized, sentenced and beheaded the next morning at St Andrews on 22 February 1563. He met his fate valiantly and consistently, reading, on his way to the scaffold, his master's noble , and turning at the instant of doom towards the palace of Holyrood, to address to his unseen mistress the famous farewell "" ("farewell to you, so beautiful and so cruel, who kill me and whom I cannot cease to love"). This at least is the version of the Memoirs of Brantôme, who is, however, notoriously untrustworthy. But for his madness of love, it is possible that Chastelard would have left no shadow or shred of himself behind. As it is, his life and death are of interest as illustrating the wild days in which his lot was cast.

Randolph's account
The English diplomat Thomas Randolph described the arrest of Chastelard in his letters to William Cecil. He notes Chastelard as a servant of Monsieur D'Anville. When he arrived in Scotland in November 1561, Mary showed him her favour by letting him ride a horse that was a present from her half-brother Lord Robert Stewart. He gave her a book of his own poems. On 14 February 1563, St Valentine's day, Chastelard was discovered in the Queen's chamber under her Great Bed at Rossend Castle at Burntisland. Mary ordered her half brother the Earl of Moray to execute him on the spot. But instead the unfortunate poet was taken to St Andrews. Randolph wrote that Chastelard had made a similar attempt at Holyroodhouse. In his defence, Chastelard claimed he had been caught in the Queen's privy but witnesses insisted he was under the bed. He was beheaded a week later at the Market Cross of St Andrews on market day. Mary was consoled by the company of Mary Fleming.

Notes

References

External links
 Chastelard, a tragedy by Algernon Charles Swinburne at Project Gutenberg
 Brantome's account of Chastelard is quoted with an example of his verse in; Laboureur, Jean de, ed., Les memoires de Messire Michel de Castelnau, seigneur de Mauvissiere, vol.1 (1731), pp. 547–550

1540 births
1563 deaths
French poets
Court of Mary, Queen of Scots
British and English royal favourites
People executed by Stuart Scotland
Executed French people
People executed by the Kingdom of Scotland by decapitation
French male poets